WPMO (1580 kHz) is a commercial AM radio station licensed to Pascagoula-Moss Point, Mississippi.  The station airs a sports radio format, and is owned by Noah Britt, through licensee Tri City Radio, LLC.  Most programming comes from the CBS Sports Radio Network.

By day, WPMO is powered at 5,000 watts.  But to protect other stations on 1580 AM from interference, at night it reduces power to 51 watts.  It uses a directional antenna at all times, with a two-tower array.  The radio studios and transmitter are on Telephone Road in Pascagoula.

History
Its call sign changed to WPMO in March 2011. It had also used the WPMO call letters in the late-1980s.

Previous logo

References

External links

PMO
Sports radio stations in the United States